Henry "Rufe" Johnson (October 2, 1908  – February 4, 1974), was an American Piedmont blues guitarist, harmonica player, pianist, banjo player, singer and songwriter. On occasion he played slide guitar with a pocket knife. He finally found a larger audience with his 1973 album, The Union County Flash! His fame was short-lived, as he died months after its release.

Life and career
Johnson was born in the small settlement of Bogansville, near to the towns of Union and Jonesville, South Carolina. His elder brother, Roosevelt, taught Johnson the rudiments of guitar playing, and he was further instructed by his cousin Thelmon Johnson. His childhood nickname, Rufe, which stayed with him throughout his life, was a shortening of Rooster. He learned to play in standard tuning and mainly played gospel songs, but his family's record collection also exposed him to secular music, such as that of Blind Lemon Jefferson, Blind Blake and later Blind Boy Fuller. He also got the opportunity to play alongside several white musicians. He expanded his repertoire in 1933, when he taught himself to play the piano, and he played at a local church for several years. Johnson performed with two vocal groups, the West Spring Friendly Four and the Silver Star Quartet, which were broadcast on the radio stations WPSA and WBSU, respectively.

In 1952, he moved from working on a farm to a hospital job, while also making a gradual transition to playing more secular material, on a part-time basis. Discovered by blues historians, Johnson started to give solo concerts, performed on the radio, and joined up musically with his childhood friend Peg Leg Sam.

Following recording sessions in November and December 1972, his album The Union County Flash! was issued by Trix Records in 1973. He also provided guitar and vocals, along with Baby Tate, for a couple of tracks on Peg Leg Sam's album Medicine Show Man, released in the same year.

Johnson died of kidney failure in Union, South Carolina, on February 4, 1974, age 65.

Discography

CD albums

See also
List of Piedmont blues musicians

References

1908 births
1974 deaths
American blues guitarists
American blues singers
American blues pianists
American male pianists
American male guitarists
20th-century African-American male singers
20th-century American singers
20th-century American guitarists
American banjoists
Piedmont blues musicians
People from Union, South Carolina
Songwriters from South Carolina
Guitarists from South Carolina
Deaths from kidney failure
20th-century American male singers
20th-century American pianists
African-American songwriters
African-American pianists
African-American guitarists
American male songwriters